This is a list of friendly fire incidents by the U.S. Military on allied British personnel and civilians.

Korean War 

23 September 1950: During the "Battle of Hill 282", three United States Air Force F-51 Mustang aircraft attacked a position held by the British Army's 1st Battalion, Argyll and Sutherland Highlanders, with cannon fire and napalm, killing 17 and wounding 76. This was a result of an improper radio contact by British ground forces with the F-51s and the pilots not being informed by several British forward air controllers of proper air recognition panels.

Gulf War 
26 February 1991: Six British soldiers of the 3rd Battalion, Royal Regiment of Fusiliers, and ten members of the attached Company of Queen's Own Highlanders were killed and further three injured after their Warrior armoured vehicles were hit by Maverick missiles fired by two U.S. A-10 ground attack aircraft. An Oxford inquest returned a verdict of unlawful killings. 
27 February 1991: Two British soldiers of the Queen's Royal Irish Hussars were injured when their Scorpion armoured vehicles were fired on and hit by U.S. M1 Abrams tanks.

Iraqi no-fly zones 
14 April 1994: Two British officers were among the 26 Coalition personnel killed in the 1994 Black Hawk shootdown incident caused by two USAF F-15s.

Iraq War 
23 March 2003: An RAF Tornado jet was shot down by a U.S. Patriot missile, killing two crewmen. Investigations showed that the Tornado's identification friend or foe indicator had malfunctioned and hence it was not identified as a friendly aircraft.
28 March 2003: British Lance-Corporal of Horse Matty Hull was killed by U.S. A-10 jets as well as five others wounded in the 190th Fighter Squadron, Blues and Royals friendly fire incident.
6 April 2003: During the Battle of Debecka Pass, BBC World Affairs Editor John Simpson and members of his crew were injured when a bomb dropped from a U.S. F-15 aircraft hit a friendly Kurdish and U.S. Special Forces convoy, killing 15 people, including BBC translator Kamaran Abdurazaq Muhamed.

War in Afghanistan 
5 December 2006: Royal Marine Jonathan Wigley died by gunfire from a U.S. F-18 Hornet aircraft.
23 August 2007: A bomb dropped by an F-15 killed three soldiers of the Royal Anglian Regiment and wounded a further two. During the subsequent inquest, issues such as inadequate communication equipment and incorrect coordinates from a British forward air controller were raised. The coroner finally stated it was due to the "flawed application of procedures" rather than individual errors or "recklessness".
21 December 2009: A British soldier was fatally shot by a US helicopter crew in Afghanistan who thought they were attacking an enemy base. Gunfire from the helicopters left 11 injured on the ground. The coroner criticised the British commanders for the fact Patrol Base Almas was not marked on military maps, for the 'unprofessional' use of grainy images and for insisting there were no friendly forces in the area to the Apache crew.

References

Friendly fire incidents
United Kingdom–United States military relations
United Kingdom military-related lists
United States military-related lists